Garfield Goes Hollywood is a 1987 American animated television special based on the Garfield comic strip. It once again featured Lorenzo Music as the voice of Garfield. The special was first broadcast May 8, 1987 on CBS and was nominated for Outstanding Animated Program at the 39th Primetime Emmy Awards. It has been released on both VHS and DVD home video.

This was the sixth of twelve Garfield television specials made between 1982 and 1991. In the special, Garfield attempts to raise money to go to Hollywood and appear on Pet Search.

Storyline 
Garfield and Odie believe their dance routines (as performed atop a fence at night) cannot be beaten and so does Jon. They happen to be watching "Pet Search" (a pets' version of Star Search) when after Garfield opines that they could come up with a better act, Jon agrees, and they come up with a great idea to go on the show after seeing a past winner. Jon is hoping to win the $1,000 prize, which Garfield is unimpressed with. They perform as an Elvis style trio called "Johnny Bop and the Two-Steps" (rather reluctantly, because they did not want Jon involved in their act, as they think he is awful at music). Garfield believes it is embarrassing because they all have to wear kitschy 1950's-era costumes.

Despite the silly act, they win the regional competition (after a dog that plays five instruments simultaneously is disqualified after Odie exposes him as just a man in a dog costume) and are able to compete at the national competition in Hollywood. They hit the road to Hollywood and arrive at their fancy Beverly Hills hotel. Garfield and Odie agree that their act is too mediocre to win first prize, so they destroy Jon's guitar when he is not looking, but he gets shocked upon seeing the mess and becomes sad and worried after Garfield tells him what happened. This allows Garfield and Odie to come up with a better act for the show.

Meanwhile the "Pet Search" finals are underway with a different host named Burt and an announcer named Bob. Bob tells Burt about the prizes the top winner will receive including $1,000,000 and the second place winner will receive a boat. While Jon, Garfield. and Odie watch the other competitors, Jon tells them that even though they were happy they won the first "Pet Search" contest, $1,000, made it to Hollywood, and would like to take the prizes for first place, he thinks that Garfield and Odie should lose the finals and return to their old lives as a prize of their own, but Garfield disagrees. Garfield and Odie compete in the finals as a tango dancing duo called "The Dancing Armandos," only to receive the boat for second place and lose the top prize package to an opera-singing cat. Angry over losing, Garfield destroys the set, but Jon assures him that they won the boat as a prize. The special ends back home where Garfield finally admits to Jon that it was all for the best that they are home again, as they are on their boat fantasizing about sailing to exotic locations worldwide, despite the fact that they live in a landlocked area and have to settle for sitting on it in the backyard.

Cast 
 Lorenzo Music - Garfield
 Thom Huge - Jon Arbuckle
 Gregg Berger - Odie / TV Host / Bob / Grandma Fogerty
 Nino Tempo - Herbie
 Frank Welker - M.C.

Uncredited 
 Desirée Goyette - Desirée the Classical Cat

Songs 
 "They Love Us" performed by Lou Rawls
 "The Wizard of Love" performed by Thom Huge, Lorenzo Music and Desirée Goyette
 "Hollywood Feels So Good" performed by Lou Rawls
 "Desiree's Meow Solo" performed by Desirée Goyette

References

External links 
 
 

Garfield television specials
1980s American television specials
1980s animated television specials
1987 television specials
1987 in American television
CBS television specials
Television shows directed by Phil Roman
Hollywood, Los Angeles in fiction
Film Roman television specials
Television shows written by Jim Davis (cartoonist)